The Syllabus of Errors is the name given to a document issued by the Holy See under Pope Pius IX on 8 December 1864, as an appendix to the  encyclical. It condemns a total 80 of what the pope considered as errors or heresies, articulating Catholic Church teaching on a number of philosophical and political questions.

The purpose of the Syllabus was not to explain in depth, but only to summarize each error briefly and to refer to the corresponding papal documents which define and explicate in detail. These detailed documents are essential for understanding the pope's view.

History
On 8 December 1864, the Feast of the Immaculate Conception, the Holy See under Pope Pius IX issued the Syllabus of Errors, a compilation of what the Catholic Church believed to be heresies in the philosophical and political realm. It listed them, and referred to older Church documents previously issued on these matters.

Summary 
The Syllabus is made up of phrases and paraphrases from earlier papal documents, along with index references to them, presenting a list of "condemned propositions". The Syllabus does not explain why each particular proposition is wrong, but cites earlier documents considering each subject.

The Syllabus is divided into ten sections of 80 propositions which condemn various errors about the following topics:
pantheism, naturalism, and absolute rationalism, #1–7
moderate rationalism, #8–14
indifferentism and latitudinarianism, #15–18
socialism, communism, secret societies, Bible societies, and liberal clerical societies, a general condemnation, unnumbered
the Catholic Church and her rights, #19–38 (defending temporal power in the Papal States, overthrown six years later)
civil society and its relationship to the church, #39–55
natural and Christian ethics, #56–64
Christian marriage, #65–74
the civil power of the sovereign Pontiff in the Papal States, #75–76
liberalism in every political form, #77–80.

Reactions

Non-Catholics
In 1874, the British Leader of the Opposition William Gladstone published a tract entitled The Vatican Decrees in their bearing on Civil Allegiance: A Political Expostulation, in which he said that after the Syllabus:

no one can now become [Rome's] convert without renouncing his moral and mental freedom, and placing his civil loyalty and duty at the mercy of another.

Catholics
Catholic apologists such as Félix Dupanloup and John Henry Newman said that the Syllabus was widely misinterpreted by readers who did not have access to, or did not bother to check, the original documents of which it was a summary. The propositions listed had been condemned as erroneous opinions in the sense and context in which they originally occurred; without the original context, the document appeared to condemn a larger range of ideas than it actually did. Thus, it was asserted that no critical response to the Syllabus could be valid, if it did not take into account the cited documents and their context. Newman writes:
The Syllabus then has no dogmatic force; it addresses us, not in its separate portions, but as a whole, and is to be received from the Pope by an act of obedience, not of faith, that obedience being shown by having recourse to the original and authoritative documents, (Allocutions and the like,) to which the Syllabus pointedly refers. Moreover, when we turn to those documents, which are authoritative, we find the Syllabus cannot even be called an echo of the Apostolic Voice; for, in matters in which wording is so important, it is not an exact transcript of the words of the Pope, in its account of the errors condemned, just as would be natural in what is an index for reference.
As the English Catholic historian E. E. Y. Hales explained, concerning item #77: "[T]he Pope is not concerned with a universal principle, but with the position in a particular state at a particular date. He is expressing his 'wonder and distress' (no more) that in a Catholic country (Spain) it should be proposed to disestablish the Church and to place any and every religion upon a precisely equal footing.... Disestablishment and toleration were far from the normal practice of the day, whether in Protestant or in Catholic states." Newman points out that this item refers to the 26 July 1855 allocution Nemo vestrum. At this time, Spain had been in violation of its Concordat of 1851 with the Holy See (implemented 1855).

In the wake of the controversy following the document's release, Pius IX referred to it as "raw meat needing to be cooked". However, others within the church who supported the Syllabus disagreed that there was any misinterpretation of the condemnations. The Syllabus was an attack on liberalism, modernism, moral relativism, secularization, and the political emancipation of Europe from the tradition of Catholic monarchies.

Sources cited
The Syllabus cites a number of previous documents that had been written during Pius's papacy. These include: Qui pluribus, Maxima quidem, Singulari quadam, Tuas libenter, Multiplices inter, Quanto conficiamur, Noscitis, Nostis et nobiscum, Meminit unusquisque, Ad Apostolicae, Nunquam fore, Incredibili, Acerbissimum, Singularis nobisque, Multis gravibusque, Quibus quantisque, Quibus luctuosissimis, In consistoriali, Cum non sine, Cum saepe, Quanto conficiamur, Jamdudum cernimus, Novos et ante, Quibusque vestrum and Cum catholica.

Subsequent history
In the 21 November 1873 encyclical, Etsi multa ("On the Church in Italy, Germany, and Switzerland"), which is often appended to the Syllabus, Pius expresses further thoughts in the same vein, condemning contemporary liberalizing anti-clerical legislation in South America as "a ferocious war on the Church".

In 1907, Lamentabili sane exitu was promulgated, a "Syllabus condemning the errors of the Modernists", being a list of errors made by scholars of biblical criticism.

References

Further reading 
 Pio Nono: A Study in European Politics and Religion in the Nineteenth Century, by E.E.Y. Hales (P.J. Kenedy, 1954)
 The Catholic Church in the Modern World by E.E.Y. Hales (Doubleday, 1958)

External links 

The Syllabus of Errors ewtn.com online text
A. Haag, "Syllabus" in the Catholic Encyclopedia (1912) newadvent.org
 
John Henry Newman's discussion of the Syllabus in Difficulties of Anglicans volume 2 (1874) newmanreader.org
Excerpt from Gladstone's The Vatican Decrees in Their Bearing on Civil Allegiance: a Political Expostulation at Victorian Web
Explains how "apparent contradictions" between the Syllabus and Vatican should be reconciled. seattlecatholic.com
The Syllabus, the Controversy, and the Context In This Rock Magazine, January 2009

Documents of Pope Pius IX
Catholic theology and doctrine
Modern history of Italy
History of the papacy
1864 documents
1864 in Christianity